Helltown (formerly, Butte Creek and Hilltown) is an unincorporated community in Butte County, California.

References

Unincorporated communities in California
Unincorporated communities in Butte County, California